The 2008–09 Missouri Tigers men's basketball team finished 31–7 and reached the Elite Eight of the NCAA tournament. Led by head coach Mike Anderson, Mizzou finished third in the Big 12 with a conference record of 12–4 and also won the Big 12 men's basketball tournament for the first time in school history.

Pre-Season 
Following a .500 season in 2007–08 season, the Tigers revamped their offense with five freshmen and two transfers. The Tigers basketball team was not heralded with much in the way of high hopes coming into the 2008–09 season. Most preseason polls had Missouri finishing in the bottom-half of the Big 12 Conference, including Athlon Sports and the Big 12 coaches.

As a way to get in some much needed extra practice, coach Mike Anderson accepted an invitation to play three exhibition games in Canada in late August. In the first game of the tour, Missouri defeated the Niagara All-Stars by a score of 120–80 on August 30, 2008.  The game was played at Brock University in St. Catharines, Ontario. On August 31, 2008, in the same venue, the Tigers defeated Brock University 117–68. This game gave the Missouri coaching staff and fans a nice look at the fresh faces, as Mizzou's seven newcomers combined for 66 of the Tiger's 117 points on the afternoon. The next morning, the Tigers closed out the Canadian trip by beating the Southern Ontario All-Stars by a final score of 109–92.

The Tigers played two pre-season games in 2008. The first was against Lincoln (MO), winning the game 97–54. The second of their two pre-season games was against Missouri Southern, resulting in an 87–58 Tigers victory.

Recruiting

Schedule 

|-
!colspan=12 style=|Summer Canadian Exhibition

|-
!colspan=12 style=|Exhibition

|-
!colspan=12 style=|Non-conference regular season

|-
!colspan=12 style=|Big 12 Regular Season

|-
!colspan=12 style=|Big 12 Tournament 

|-
!colspan=12 style=|NCAA Tournament

Roster

Rankings

See also 
2008–09 Big 12 Conference men's basketball season
2009 NCAA Division I men's basketball tournament
2008-09 NCAA Division I men's basketball season
2008-09 NCAA Division I men's basketball rankings
List of NCAA Division I institutions

References 

Missouri
Missouri
Missouri Tigers men's basketball seasons
Tiger
Tiger